This is a list of Winners for the Sydney to Hobart Yacht Race since 1945.

Line honours winners

Handicap winners

References

 
Sydney to Hobart winners
Australia sport-related lists
Lists of sports champions by sport